Moldovenesc style or Moldavian architectural style is a type of architecture developed in Moldavia during the 14th through 19th centuries. 

The period of maximum flowering of this style was in the period of Stephen III of Moldavia. The Moldavian monasteries which belongs to the UNESCO heritage are made in this style.

See also
Painted churches of northern Moldavia
Romanian architecture

Gallery

References

External links

Architecture in Romania
Architecture in Moldova